Mannadi metro station is a Metro railway station on the Blue Line of the Chennai Metro in Chennai, India. The station is among the underground stations along blue line of the Chennai Metro, Wimco Nagar–Chennai International Airport stretch. The station serves the neighbourhoods of Mannadi and George Town.

History

Construction

The station
The station was opened for public on 10 February 2019. However, some portions of the construction work remains incomplete on the date of inauguration.

Structure
Mannadi is underground Metro station situated on Blue Line (Chennai Metro).

Station layout

Facilities
List of available ATM at Mannadi metro station are

Connections

Bus
Metropolitan Transport Corporation (Chennai) bus routes number 32, 32A, 32AGS, 32B, 33, 56F serves the station from nearby Loyer Square bus stand.

Rail
Chennai Beach railway station

Entry/Exit

See also

 Chennai
 Chetput (Chennai)
 Chetput Lake
 List of Chennai metro stations
 Chennai Metro
 Railway stations in Chennai
 Chennai Mass Rapid Transit System
 Chennai Monorail
 Chennai Suburban Railway
 Chetput railway station
 Chennai International Airport
 Transport in Chennai
 Urban rail transit in India
 List of metro systems

References

External links

 
 UrbanRail.Net – descriptions of all metro systems in the world, each with a schematic map showing all stations.

Chennai Metro stations
Railway stations in Chennai